The Territorial Prelature of Itaituba is a Roman Catholic territorial prelature located in the city of Itaituba in the Ecclesiastical province of Santarém in Brazil.

History
On July 6, 1988, the Territorial Prelature of Itaituba was established from the Diocese of Santarém.

On Wednesday, December 8, 2010, Pope Benedict XVI appointed Vilmar Santin, O. Carm., until then vicar of the parish of São Lázaro e Coração Imaculado de Maria, in the Roman Catholic Archdiocese of Manaus, as the new bishop prelate of Itaituba, succeeding Bishop Capistrano Francisco Heim, O.F.M., who had resigned on reaching the age limit of 75.

It became a suffragan of the Archdiocese of Santarém in 6 November 2019 with Diocese of Óbidos

Leadership
 Prelates of Itaituba (Roman rite)
 Bishop Capistrano Francisco Heim, O.F.M. (July 6, 1988 - December 8, 2010)
 Bishop Vilmar Santin, O. Carm. (December 8, 2010 – present)

References

 GCatholic.org
 Catholic Hierarchy

Roman Catholic dioceses in Brazil
Christian organizations established in 1988
Itaituba, Roman Catholic Territorial Prelature of
Roman Catholic dioceses and prelatures established in the 20th century
Territorial prelatures